The Oued Zeen National Park (Arabic: الحديقة الوطنية بوادي الزان) is a Tunisian national park located in the delegation of Aïn Draham, about 200 kilometers west of Tunis and about fifty kilometers to the west of Jendouba. The park covers an area of 6700 hectares. It was opened in 2010.

References

National parks of Tunisia
Jendouba Governorate